The Miss Universo Paraguay 2012 pageant was held on May 18, 2012. Alba Riquelme, Miss Universo Paraguay 2011, crowned her successor Egny Eckert at the end of the event; she was the Paraguayan candidate for the 2012 Miss Universe pageant. Elected to represent Paraguay at Miss World 2012 was Fiorella Migiore, for Miss International 2012 was Nicole Huber, and for Miss Earth 2012 was Alexandra Fretes. The pageant was broadcast live on Telefuturo.

Results

Delegates
There were 7 official contestants.

Judges
The following persons judged the final competition.
Gloria Suarez de Limpias
Elenita Ortiz de Dellavedova
Vivian Benítez
Fiorella Forestieri de Buzarquis
Pedro Sanabria
Juan José Martínez
José Espínola
Mirtha Alcaraz
Guillermo Cortes

See also
Miss Paraguay

External links
Miss Universo Paraguay Official Website.
Promociones Gloria.
MissParaguay.org.

References

2012
2012 beauty pageants
2012 in Paraguay
May 2012 events in South America